Mount Julia is an extinct volcano located in The West Coast Range, on the West Coast of  Tasmania, Australia with an elevation of  above sea level.

Geology 
Mount Julia was a shield volcano of the Mount Read Volcanics on Tasmania West Coast. The last eruption was 500 million years ago.

References

Volcanoes of Tasmania
Inactive volcanoes
West Coast Range